Béni Ikhlef is a town and commune in Kerzaz District, Béchar Province, in western Algeria. As of  the 2008 census, its population was 2,459, up from 2,280 in 1998, with an annual growth rate of 0.8%.

Geography

Béni Ikhlef lies on the left (northeast) bank of the Oued Saoura in the Saoura valley. The Grand Erg Occidental, a large area of continuous sand dunes lies to the east, while the rocky ridges of the Ougarta Range rise to the west, running from northwest to southeast along the opposite side of the river from the town.

Climate

Béni Ikhlef has a hot desert climate, with extremely hot summers and warm winters, and very little precipitation throughout the year.

<div style="width:75%;">

Economy

Agriculture is the main industry in Béni Ikhlef. There are a total of 36,420 date palms planted in the commune. As of 2009 there were 614 sheep, 347 goats, 45 camels, and 13 cattle. There were also 6700 chickens.

Tourist attractions include sand dunes, palm groves and an ancient fort.

Infrastructure and housing

95% of Béni Ikhlef's population is connected to drinking water, 95% is also connected to the sewerage system, and 91% (including 560 buildings) have access to electricity.

Béni Ikhlef has a total of 436 houses, of which 302 are occupied, giving an occupation rate of 8.1 inhabitants per occupied building.

Transportation

Béni Ikhlef is on the N6 national highway between Béchar to the northwest and Adrar to the southeast. Towns accessible to the north via the N6 include El Ouata, Béni Abbès and Igli, while to the south the towns of Kerzaz, Timoudi and Ouled Khoudir can be accessed.

Education

There are 3 elementary schools, with 20 classrooms including 15 in use. There are a total of 706 school students.

9.1% of the population has a tertiary education (the second highest in the province), and another 21.9% has competed secondary education. The overall literacy rate is 81.8%, and is 90.6% among males and 72.6% among females.

Health

Béni Ikhlef has one room care facility. There are no hospitals, clinics, or pharmacies. The nearest clinics are in Kerzaz and El Ouata, and the nearest hospital is in Béni Abbès.

Religion

Béni Ikhlef has 2 operational mosques, with another 1 under construction.

Localities
The commune is composed of two localities:

Béni Ikhlef
Guerzim

References

Neighbouring towns and cities

Communes of Béchar Province